Monte Prado (or Prato) is  a mountain in the northern Apennines, located in the trait between the Pradarena and Radici Passes, with an altitude of .

Geography 
Monte Prado is right on the boundary between the province of Reggio Emilia and that of Lucca.

Environment protection 
The mountain is part of the National Park of the Appennino Tosco-Emiliano.

See also 
 List of Italian regions by highest point

References

See also
 List of Italian regions by highest point

Mountains of Emilia-Romagna
Mountains of Tuscany
Mountains of the Apennines
Highest points of Italian regions
Two-thousanders of Italy